Spiteful may refer to:

, various Royal Navy ships
Spiteful-class destroyer, a Royal Navy class of two destroyers built in 1898 and 1899
, a Union Army American Civil War steamer originally the Army tug Spiteful
Supermarine Spiteful, a fighter intended to replace the Spitfire, but made obsolete by jet aircraft

Entertainment
Spiteful, album by Sonny Vincent & Spite 2014
"Spiteful" (PartyNextDoor song), song by PartyNextDoor

See also
Spite (disambiguation)